Chrysoritis chrysantas, the Karoo daisy copper, is a butterfly of the family Lycaenidae. It is found in South Africa, where it is known from the Northern Cape to the Western Cape.

The wingspan is 22–25 mm for males and 27–30 mm for females. Adults are on wing from August to November and from March to May. There are two generations per year.

References

Butterflies described in 1868
Chrysoritis
Endemic butterflies of South Africa
Taxa named by Roland Trimen